Chakma cinema, often known as Chakwood and formerly known as Chakma film, is the Chakma language film industry based in Tripura, Mizoram, Arunachal Pradesh, Bangladesh and Myanmar. The first Chakma film, Tanyabi Firti (Tanyabi's Lake), directed by Satarupa Sanyal was released on 19 July 2005. Tanyabi's Lake is the first Video film to have a commercial screening at a theatre. As the production of video films gained momentum, the Chakma film industry got expanded and around 3-10 films are made each year. Mor Thengari is the first Bangladeshi Chakma language film telling a story for the first time in an indigenous language in Bangladesh.

Notable Chakma films

References

 
 
Cinema by culture
Cinema of Tripura
Cinema of Bangladesh
Cinema of Mizoram